Bafel Jalal Talabani (Kurdish: بافڵ جەلال تاڵەبانی), known as Bafel Talabani (Kurdish: بافڵ تاڵەبانی) (born 1 January 1973), is an Iraqi Kurdish politician and current leader of the Patriotic Union of Kurdistan (PUK). He is the older son of former PUK leader Jalal Talabani.

Military career

Talabani underwent formal military training with the French Foreign Legion and British Special Forces. Following the 2003 U.S. invasion of Iraq, Talabani returned to Sulaymaniyah and took up his first official role as head of the Zanyari, the PUK's intelligence unit. In 2005, he founded and led the Counter-Terrorism Group of Kurdistan, and recruited members from the Peshmerga, which worked in support of the Multi-National Force – Iraq. These were initially focused on combatting the spread of al-Qaeda in Iraq. That same year, he launched a counterintelligence mission that resulted in the killing of Abdullah Qasre, a member of the Kurdistan Islamic Group.

He stepped down from full-time military service in 2010 to support the political interests of the PUK. He returned in the mid-2010s to join the fight against the Islamic State.

Political career
After leaving active service, Bafel based himself at the family compound in Sulaymaniyah. He is credited as being a dealmaker and a political fixer within the party, as well as being able to move smoothly across partisan divides in the best interests of Kurdistan. Bafel was also behind his younger brother Qubad Talabani's emergence as a political figure with the latter becoming deputy prime minister of Iraqi Kurdistan.

In 2016, Bafel headed PUK's decision-making body and accompanied PUK's delegation to Iran for talks. He is claimed to have had a decisive role in bringing back traditional PUK leaders as a high-ranking member of the Talabani family. He is credited with de-escalating PUK tensions, restoring a joint leadership of PUK with Gorran Movement and preparing a unified response to Masoud Barzani, former President of Iraqi Kurdistan and leader of the Kurdistan Democratic Party (KDP).

Developments in late 2017
During the 2017 Kurdistan Region independence referendum, Bafel worked as a mediator between the KRG, Iraq and the international community, and worked to present an alternative delayed-vote solution. Although accepted by the main actors both internally and externally, the solution was ultimately rejected by Masoud Barzani.

Bafel blamed the loss of Kirkuk and oil-rich regions on the decision of the KDP to go ahead with a referendum on independence. He called the decision a "colossal mistake", saying a U.S. proposal to postpone the referendum by two years should have been accepted. This would have avoided the current situation in which Iraq gained control of areas managed by Kurds since 2014.

In October, Iraqi forces took control of Kirkuk province after intense fighting against the Peshmerga. Bafel Talabani purportedly ordered his military forces to withdraw from the region, allowing the Iraqi Army and the Popular Mobilization Forces to establish control of the region. Subsequently, he has been criticized by Kurdish nationalists for the "betrayal" of the Kurdish struggle for independence.

Bafel, however, strongly denied the accusations. He rejected as "baseless" claims that this was part of a deal he had brokered with Baghdad and Tehran, arguing that his forces had indeed fought and lost soldiers but decided to withdraw because of too many losses had occurred within the ranks of the Peshmerga.

Moreover, it emerged in a New York Times interview published in November 2017 that before the hand-over of Kirkuk, Bafel proposed yet another out of the box solution. He envisioned troops from the American-led coalition against ISIS to take over a large military base near Kirkuk, along with federal forces and Kurdish forces loyal to his father's party. According to the New York Times article, Bafel was unable to build consensus among the PUK and the ruling Kurdistan Democratic Party to proceed with his alternative plan.

Following his father's death in October 2017 and recent events, Bafel is focused on supporting the re-emergence of the PUK to be able to deliver an economically strong, socially inclusive, and stable Kurdistan.

Personal life
He is the son of Jalal Talabani, Secretary-General of the Patriotic Union of Kurdistan (PUK) and Hero Ibrahim Ahmed. He is the older brother of Qubad Talabani and a cousin of Lahur Talabany. He is married to the daughter of Mala Bakhiyar, considered a mastermind of the PUK. On 27 August 2020, Bafel tested positive for COVID-19. On 8 September 2020, he recovered from the coronavirus. He has a son named Koban.

References

Patriotic Union of Kurdistan politicians
Children of national leaders
1973 births
Living people
Kurdish politicians